Brice Aka (born 4 August 1983 in Abidjan) is an Ivorian football player who currently plays for Jomo Cosmos.

Career
Aka played previously for Vallee A.C. D'Adjame, ASEC Mimosas, in Morocco for Raja Casablanca, Club Omnisports De Meknes and with French side Stade Rennais F.C.

References

1983 births
Living people
Ivorian footballers
Expatriate footballers in France
ASEC Mimosas players
Association football forwards
Raja CA players
Expatriate footballers in Morocco
Maritzburg United F.C. players
Expatriate soccer players in South Africa
Stade Rennais F.C. players
Ivorian expatriates in France
Footballers from Abidjan
Ivorian expatriates in South Africa
COD Meknès players
Ivorian expatriates in Morocco